Prestatyn High School is the only secondary school in the town of Prestatyn, and one of 9 secondary schools in the entire county of Denbighshire. It is one of the largest schools in the region and the country with over 1,800 pupils and 250 staff. The school is taught through the English medium.

Alumni

Danny Coyne
Will Owen
Sam Wainwright

References

Educational institutions with year of establishment missing
Secondary schools in Denbighshire
Prestatyn